Ivica Momčilović (Serbian Cyrillic: Ивицa Moмчилoвић; born 4 October 1967) is a Serbian football manager and former player.

Momčilović won the European Cup and Yugoslav First League with Red Star Belgrade in 1991. He is currently a coach in the Red Star Belgrade youth section.

References

External links
Yugoslav First League footballers 1945-1992
Eurosport Profile
European Champions Cup/UEFA Champions League Winning Squads

1967 births
Living people
Association football midfielders
Yugoslav footballers
Serbian footballers
Serbian expatriate footballers
Yugoslav First League players
Cypriot First Division players
Allsvenskan players
FK Napredak Kruševac players
Red Star Belgrade footballers
Red Star Belgrade non-playing staff
FK Rad players
Trelleborgs FF players
Expatriate footballers in Sweden
AEL Limassol players
Expatriate footballers in Cyprus